The 2010 NCAA Division I Tennis Championships were the 64th annual men's and 28th annual women's championships to determine the national champions of NCAA Division I men's and women's singles, doubles, and team collegiate tennis in the United States. The tournaments were played concurrently during May 2010.

Defending champion USC defeated Tennessee in the men's championship, 4–2, to claim the Trojans' then-record eighteenth team national title.

Stanford defeated Florida in the women's championship, 4–3, to claim the Cardinal's then-record sixteenth team national title.

Host site
This year's tournaments were played at the Dan Magill Tennis Complex at the University of Georgia in Athens, Georgia.

See also
NCAA Division II Tennis Championships (Men, Women)
NCAA Division III Tennis Championships (Men, Women)

References

External links
List of NCAA Men's Tennis Champions
List of NCAA Women's Tennis Champions

NCAA Division I tennis championships
NCAA Division I Tennis Championships
NCAA Division I Tennis Championships
NCAA Division I Tennis Championships
Tennis tournaments in Georgia (U.S. state)